Research in Economics is a quarterly peer-reviewed academic journal of economics. It is published by Elsevier and the editor-in-chief is Federico Etro (Ca' Foscari University of Venice). The journal was established in 1947 as Ricerche Economiche and obtained its current title in 1997. The journal is abstracted and indexed in Research Papers in Economics.

External links 
 

Quarterly journals
Economics journals
English-language journals
Publications established in 1947
Elsevier academic journals
Hybrid open access journals